Ed' System ZVVZ was a Czech UCI Professional Continental cycling team.

Major wins
 Tour de Langkawi: Damian McDonald (1996)
 Niedersachsen-Rundfahrt: Jens Voigt (1997)
 Volta ao Algarve: Tomáš Konečný (1998)
 Okolo Slovenska: René Andrle (2000)
 Tour de Beauce: Tomáš Konečný (2000)
 Poreč Trophy 5: Tomáš Konečný (2000), Lubor Tesař (2001)
 Tour of Qinghai Lake: Martin Mareš (2005)

References

Defunct cycling teams
Cycling teams based in the Czech Republic
Cycling teams established in 1998
Cycling teams disestablished in 2005
Former UCI Professional Continental teams